King Neptune may refer to: 
 Neptune (mythology), god of the sea, referred to as "King" by some; his brothers are kings as well.
 King Neptune (pig), a pig that was used to raise $19 million in war bonds during World War II
 King Neptune, an officiator in a naval Line-crossing ceremony
 King Neptune's Adventure, an adventure game for the Nintendo Entertainment System
 King Neptune (SpongeBob SquarePants), a recurring character in SpongeBob SquarePants
 King Neptune (film), a 1932 animated short film in the Silly Symphonies series
King Neptune (statue), a large bronze statue in Virginia Beach
 King Neptune, a large limestone sculpture at Two Rocks, Australia
 King Neptune (album)

See also
Neptune (disambiguation)